Herath Mudiyanselage Tilakaratna Banda (known as T. B. M. Herath) (born 15 August 1933) was a Ceylonese politician. He was the Deputy Minister of Transport in the Second Sirimavo Bandaranaike government and member of Parliament of Sri Lanka from Walapane representing the Sri Lanka Freedom Party. He was chairman of Oya Palata village council.

References

Deputy ministers of Sri Lanka
Members of the 4th Parliament of Ceylon
Members of the 5th Parliament of Ceylon
Members of the 6th Parliament of Ceylon
Members of the 7th Parliament of Ceylon
Sri Lanka Freedom Party politicians
1933 births

Date of death missing
Year of death missing